Heteroscyphus is a genus of liverworts in the family Lophocoleaceae. 87 species are currently accepted in this worldwide group.

References

Jungermanniales
Jungermanniales genera